The 93rd District of the Iowa House of Representatives in the state of Iowa.

Current elected officials
Phyllis Thede is the representative currently representing the district.

Past representatives
The district has previously been represented by:
 James Middleswart, 1971–1973
 John Brunow, 1973–1979
 Daniel Jay, 1979–1983
 Bill Royer, 1983–1993
 Michael Moreland, 1993–1999
 Galen Davis, 1999–2001
 Mark Tremmel, 2001–2003
 Mary Gaskill, 2003–2013
 Phyllis Thede, 2013–present

References

093